Elections to Liverpool City Council were held on 1 May 1975.  One third of the council was up for election. The terms of office of the Councillors elected in 1973 with the third highest number of votes in each ward, expired and so these election results were compared with the 1973 results. Bill Smyth of the Liberal party became the Leader of the Council albeit with no overall control.

After the election, the composition of the council was:

Election result

Ward results

Abercromby, St. James

Aigburth

Allerton

Anfield

Arundel

Breckfield, St. Domingo

Broadgreen

Central, Everton, Netherfield

Childwall

Church

Clubmoor

County

Croxteth

Dingle

Dovecot

Fairfield

Fazakerley

Gillmoss

Granby, Prince's Park

Kensington

Low Hill, Smithdown

Melrose, Westminster

Old Swan

Picton

Pirrie

St. Mary's

St. Michael's

Sandhills, Vauxhall

Speke

Tuebrook

Warbreck

Woolton, East

Woolton, West

References

1975
Liverpool City Council election
City Council election, 1975
Liverpool City Council election